The Harriett was a historic apartment building located at Indianapolis, Indiana.  It was built about 1905, and was a three-story, "U"-shaped, Classical Revival style yellow brick and grey limestone building. It has been demolished.

It was listed on the National Register of Historic Places in 1983 and delisted in 2011.

References

Former National Register of Historic Places in Indiana
Residential buildings on the National Register of Historic Places in Indiana
Residential buildings completed in 1905
Neoclassical architecture in Indiana
Residential buildings in Indianapolis
National Register of Historic Places in Indianapolis
1905 establishments in Indiana